Xiaduopu is a rural town in Ningxiang City, Hunan Province, China. It is surrounded by Batang Town and Nantianping Township on the west, Jinzhou Town and Lijingpu Subdistrict on the north, Wushan Subdistrict and Bairuopu Town on the east, and Donghutang Town on the south.

Administrative division
The town is divided into six villages and three community: 
 Xiaduopu Community
 Gaoxin Community
 Fengqiao Community
 Xiangshanchong
 Tianmanxin
 Liudu'an
 Xingwang
 Changlongxin
 Longfuxin

Geography
The Xiangshanchong Reservoir is the largest reservoir and largest water body in the town.

Economy
Peaches are important to the economy.

Culture
Huaguxi is the most influence local theater.

Education
 Xiaduopu Town Central Primary School
 Ningxiang No. 12 High School

Transportation
China National Highway 319 runs through the territory of the town, as do Hunan Provincial Highway (S206) and three county rural roads. The National Highway 319 continues into Yiyang City, link Xiaduopu Town to Lijingpu Subdistrict, Yutan Subdistrict, Chengjiao Subdistrict, Jinghuapu Township.

The Provincial Highway S327 runs southeast to west through the town.

The Jinzhou Avenue passes across the town west to east.

The South Jinzhou Road, also known as Jintang Road, runs north to south through the western town.

The County Road X022 travels through central Xiaduopu.

Attractions
Fenghuang Mountain National Forest Park is a famous scenic spot in the town.

Xiangshan Temple is a Buddhist temple in the town.

References

External links
   

Divisions of Ningxiang
Ningxiang